Royal Manitoba Winter Fair (RMWF) is an annual agricultural fair near the end of March, hosted by the Provincial Exhibition of Manitoba in the Keystone Centre in Brandon, Manitoba, Canada. The largest event held in Brandon, and one of the largest agricultural events in Western Canada, the RMWF is traditionally held each year during Manitoba's academic spring break. In 1970, it received royal patronage from Queen Elizabeth II, and is one of only two fairs in Canada with royal patronage. Events at fair include show jumping and heavy horse competitions, livestock sales and displays, and hands-on agricultural awareness programs as well as exhibits and entertainment.

There were cancellations in 1917–18, 1942–45 & 2020–21.

See also
 Canadian National Exhibition
 Calgary Stampede
 Canadian Lakehead Exhibition
 Central Canada Exhibition
 K-Days
 Markham Fair
 Pacific National Exhibition
 Red River Exhibition
 Royal Agricultural Winter Fair
 Schomberg Fair
 Sooke Fall Fair
 
 Western Fair

References

Remarks by The Honourable John Harvard, P.C., O.M., Lieutenant Governor of Manitoba. Royal Manitoba Winter Fair. Formal Dinner. Keystone Centre - Brandon. 31 March 2008

External links
 

1882 establishments in Manitoba
Agricultural fairs in Canada
Events in Brandon, Manitoba
Culture of Manitoba
Festivals established in 1882
Annual events in Manitoba